A piano accordion is an accordion equipped with a right-hand keyboard similar to a piano or organ. Its acoustic mechanism is more that of an organ than a piano, as they are both aerophones, but the term "piano accordion"—coined by Guido Deiro in 1910—has remained the popular name. It may be equipped with any of the available systems for the left-hand manual.

In comparison with a piano keyboard, the keys are more rounded, smaller, and lighter to the touch. These go vertically down the side, pointing inward, toward the bellows, making them accessible to only one hand while handling the accordion.

The bass piano accordion is a variation of a piano accordion without bass buttons, with the piano keyboard sounding an octave lower than the usual low-pitched "bassoon" stop. They typically have around 3 octaves. Arrangements for accordion band may include parts for bass accordion.

History 
The first accordion to feature a piano keyboard was probably the instrument introduced in 1852 by Bouton of Paris. Another source claimed the first piano accordion was introduced in 1854 at the General German Industrial Exhibition in Munich. It was showcased by the instrument builder Mattäus Bauer and quickly became a serious competitor to button accordions.

The first chromatic piano-like accordions in Russia were built in 1871 by Nikolay Ivanovich Beloborodov.

In the United States, the piano accordion dramatically increased in popularity between 1900 and 1930 because of its familiarity to students and teachers, and its uniformity, whereby accordion dealers and instructors did not have to support different styles of accordions for many European immigrant groups. The piano keyboard layout was also promoted by the fame of Vaudeville performers Guido Deiro and his brother Pietro who premiered the instrument on stage, recordings and radio.  After the Deiros' success, popular chromatic button accordionist Pietro Frosini chose to disguise his accordion's buttons to look like a piano keyboard so as not to appear "old-fashioned." (See Accordion music genres)
The piano accordion is the official city instrument of San Francisco

As of 1972 it could be largely said that the piano system dominated the English-speaking North American continent, Scotland, and certain East European countries, while differing button systems are generally to be found in Scandinavia, France, Belgium and former Soviet countries. The piano accordion is also predominant in Italy, New Zealand, Australia and South Africa.

See also
Accordion reed ranks and switches
Button accordion
Bandoneon
Squeezebox
List of All-Ireland piano accordion champions

Notes

References

External links 
 
 Piano Accordion - Videos And Links

Musical keyboard layouts
Accordion
Piano